Theodore "Ted" Stuban (July 13, 1928 – November 27, 2013) was a Democratic member of the Pennsylvania House of Representatives. He was first elected in the general election of 1976, taking office in 1977.  He was reelected seven times, representing the 109th Legislative District through the end of the 1992 session.  He retired from active political involvement with the end of his eighth term.

Born July 13, 1928 in Berwick, Pennsylvania.  Stuban maintained a dual career as a licensed auctioneer while serving in the House.  Prior to being elected to the legislature, Stuban held office as Mayor of Briar Creek Borough in Columbia County and also served on the Berwick Borough Council.  He was of Ukrainian heritage. 
 Stuban died in 2013.

References

1928 births
2013 deaths
People from Berwick, Pennsylvania
Democratic Party members of the Pennsylvania House of Representatives
American people of Ukrainian descent